Euthlastoblatta abortiva, the fragile cockroach, is a species of cockroach in the family Ectobiidae. It is found in Central America and North America.

References

Further reading

 

Cockroaches
Articles created by Qbugbot
Insects described in 1904